100 Years of Love is a 1954 Italian  anthology film directed by . It stars actor Gabriele Ferzetti.

It was shot at Cinecittà Studios in Rome. The film's sets were designed by the art director Franco Lolli.

Cast

References

External links

1954 films
Films scored by Nino Rota
Films scored by Mario Nascimbene
1950s Italian-language films
Italian anthology films
Films based on works by Gabriele D'Annunzio
Films shot at Cinecittà Studios
Italian black-and-white films
1950s Italian films